The 2020 Eden-Monaro by-election was held on 4 July 2020 to elect the next Member of the Australian Parliament for the division of Eden-Monaro in the House of Representatives. The by-election was triggered following the resignation of incumbent Labor MP Mike Kelly. Kelly resigned on 30 April 2020, citing ill health.

The poll occurred amidst the COVID-19 pandemic, and was the first by-election of the 46th Parliament of Australia. On the morning after the by-election, ABC News psephologist Antony Green called the election for the Labor candidate Kristy McBain.

Background

The electorate of Eden-Monaro has long been regarded as a bellwether seat. From the 1972 federal election to the 2013 federal election, the seat was won by a member of the same political party that also formed government following the election. At the 2016 election, the seat was won by Mike Kelly, who defeated incumbent Liberal MP Peter Hendy. Kelly, a veteran of the Australian Army, had previously represented the electorate in the House of Representatives between 2007 and 2013, and retained his seat at the 2019 election despite a 2% swing against him. At the time, Eden-Monaro was Labor's fourth-most marginal seat, held by a margin of only 0.85%.

Prime Minister and Leader of the Liberal Party Scott Morrison confirmed that the party would contest a by-election in Eden-Monaro were it to occur. Deputy Prime Minister and Leader of the National Party Michael McCormack also declared his party would contest the by-election.

After speculation that he would retire from politics, Kelly announced his resignation on 30 April, citing personal health issues relating to his time in the Australian Army.

Key dates
Key dates in relation to the by-election are:
 Thursday, 28 May 2020 – Issue of writ 
 Thursday, 4 June 2020 – Close of electoral rolls (8pm)
 Tuesday, 9 June 2020 – Close of nominations (12 noon)
 Wednesday, 10 June 2020 – Declaration of nominations (12 noon)
 Monday, 15 June 2020 – Start of early voting
 Saturday, 4 July 2020 – Polling day (8am to 6pm)
 Friday, 17 July 2020 – Last day for receipt of postal votes
 Monday, 20 July 2020 – Declaration of result
 Saturday, 5 September 2020 – Last day for return of writs

Preselection

Labor
Kristy McBain, Mayor of Bega Valley Shire, nominated for Labor preselection on 1 May 2020. Anthony Albanese, the federal Labor leader, endorsed McBain as his preferred candidate later that day. On 4 May, McBain was preselected as Labor's candidate, against Yass Valley branch president Michael Pilbrow.

Liberal
On 5 May, Andrew Constance, New South Wales Minister for Transport and Roads and state MP for Bega confirmed that he would seek Liberal Party preselection, before announcing the following day he would not run for the seat. Jerry Nockles, a former Navy seaman, and Pru Gordon, the general manager for economics and trade at the National Farmers' Federation, were also named as potential candidates.

Preselection for the Liberal Party was held on 22–23 May, and was contested by two candidates:
Fiona Kotvojs, the Liberal Party candidate for Eden-Monaro at the 2019 federal election, and
Mark Schweikert, a Queanbeyan–Palerang councillor and director in the Department of Defence.

Following the preselection, Kotvojs was endorsed as the Liberal Party candidate.

Nationals
John Barilaro, the Deputy Premier of New South Wales and state MP for Monaro, had publicly expressed interest in running for Nationals preselection, though on 4 May he announced that he would not stand for the seat.

Preselection for the National Party was held on 6 June, and was contested by four candidates:
 Fleur Flanery, organiser of the Australian Landscape Conference,
 Michael Green, farmer and chair of the NSW Farmers Association (Cooma branch),
 Mareeta Grundy, former candidate for Queanbeyan–Palerang Regional Council, and
 Trevor Hicks, former Deputy Mayor of Queanbeyan–Palerang Regional Council.

Following the preselection, Hicks was endorsed as the National Party candidate.

Candidates

Opinion polling

Notes
1. 3% One Nation, 11% others/undecided
2. 6.5% One Nation, 5.4% others/undecided

Results

See also
 List of Australian federal by-elections

References

External links
 Eden-Monaro by-election – ABC Elections
 Eden-Monaro by-election – Australian Electoral Commission
 Eden-Monaro by-election – The Tally Room

2020 elections in Australia
New South Wales federal by-elections
July 2020 events in Australia